Ryszard Julian Ćwikła (1 January 1946 in Zakopane – 28 April 1992 in Nice) was a Polish alpine skier who competed in the 1968 Winter Olympics.

References

1946 births
1992 deaths
Polish male alpine skiers
Olympic alpine skiers of Poland
Alpine skiers at the 1968 Winter Olympics
Sportspeople from Zakopane
20th-century Polish people